The Manual of Patent Examining Procedure (MPEP) is published by the United States Patent and Trademark Office (USPTO) for use by patent attorneys and agents and patent examiners.  It describes all of the laws and regulations that must be followed in the examination of U.S. patent applications, and articulates their application to an enormous variety of different situations.  The MPEP is based on Title 37 of the Code of Federal Regulations, which derives its authority from Title 35 of the United States Code, as well as on case law arising under those titles.  The first version of the MPEP was published in 1920 by the Patent and Trademark Office Society.

The MPEP is used extensively by patent attorneys and agents to help make sure they and Examiners follow the proper USPTO regulations.  The USPTO registration examination tests knowledge of the MPEP and the underlying laws and regulations.

The MPEP is available in both PDF and HTML versions.  The current version of the MPEP is the 9th Edition, which was released in March 2014. The MPEP has traditionally been available in paper form, but electronic versions are now used more often, particularly because an applicant only may consult the electronic versions while taking the USPTO registration examination, or the patent bar examination. As of March, 2014 the patent bar examination tests the 9th Edition.

The MPEP provides guidance to members of the public on how to present persuasive arguments to a patent examiner as to why a patent should be granted on a given patent application.  See in particular Chapter 2100 on patentability.

Contents 
The MPEP comprises the following chapters:

 0100, Secrecy, Access, National Security, and Foreign Filing
 0200, Types, Cross-Noting, and Status of Application
 0300, Ownership and Assignment
 0400, Representative of Inventor or Owner
 0500, Receipt and Handling of Mail and Papers
 0600, Parts, Form, and Content of Application
 0700, Examination of Applications
 0800, Restriction in Applications Filed Under 35 U.S.C. 111; Double Patenting
 0900, Prior Art, Classification, and Search
 1000, Matters Decided by Various U.S. Patent and Trademark Office Officials
 1100, Statutory Invention Registration (SIR) and Pre-Grant Publication (PG Pub)
 1200, Appeal
 1300, Allowance and Issue
 1400, Correction of Patents
 1500, Design Patents
 1600, Plant Patents
 1700, Miscellaneous
 1800, Patent Cooperation Treaty
 1900, Protest
 2000, Duty of Disclosure
 2100, Patentability
 2200, Citation of Prior Art and Ex Parte Reexamination of Patents
 2300, Interference Proceedings
 2400, Biotechnology
 2500, Maintenance Fees
 2600, Optional Inter Partes Reexamination
 2700, Patent Terms and Extensions
 2800, Supplemental Examination
 2900, International Design Applications
 Appendix I, Partial List of Trademarks'
 Appendix II, List of Decisions Cited Appendix L, Patent Laws Appendix R, Patent Rules Appendix T, Patent Cooperation Treaty Appendix AI, Administrative Instructions Under The PCT Appendix P, Paris Convention Index, Subject Matter Index Chapter FPC, Form Paragraphs Consolidated Replications 
Many third parties have replicated the MPEP in electronic form.

 Commercial replications 
Commercial replications, that is, those that require a fee/subscription service to access the MPEP include, an iPhone App called, LawStack MPEP (provides free trial), and an e-Book version provided by Thomson Reuters.

 Non-commercial replications 
Non-commercial replications, that is, those that are provided freely without any fees or charges, include one provided by Tysver Beck Evans LLP  and a searchable replication provided by Chhabra Law. The USPTO also provides a searchable replication on its website.

 See also 
United States Patents Quarterly (USPQ)Compendium of U.S. Copyright Office PracticesTrademark Manual of Examining Procedure (TMEP)Manual of Patent Office Practice'' (MOPOP) (Canadian patent law)
Manual of Patent Practice, issued by the United Kingdom's Intellectual Property Office
Guidelines for Examination in the European Patent Office
United States Patent Classification
Patent Application Information Retrieval (PAIR)

References

External links  
 Manual of Patent Examining Procedure (MPEP) on the USPTO web site

United States patent law
Publications of the United States government
Works about patent law